Sir Terence Power McLean  (15 July 1913 – 11 July 2004), often known simply by his initials as T. P. McLean, was a New Zealand sports journalist and author specialising in rugby union.

Early life and family
McLean was born in Wanganui and died in Auckland. He was educated at New Plymouth Boys' High School. He married Margaret Coyle in 1940; they had one son and two daughters.

He came from a rugby family, and several other McLeans were notable in the New Zealand rugby union, including Hubert McLean who was an All Black in the 1930s. His father and four uncles played for Wanganui, and his brothers Gordon (Taranaki) and Bob (Wellington) played at the provincial level.

Career
McLean commenced as a journalist on the Auckland Sun in 1930, subsequently working on the Hastings Tribune, New Zealand Observer, Taranaki Daily News, and Evening Post (Wellington). After service in World War II, he joined the New Zealand Herald  in Auckland as sports editor in 1946.

For the next 30 years, McLean accompanied most All Black teams overseas and visiting sides in New Zealand, writing a series of tour books and other books on rugby, 32 in total. He retired from the Herald in 1978.

Honours and awards
In the 1978 Queen's Birthday Honours, McLean was appointed a Member of the Order of the British Empire for services to sporting journalism. In the New Year Honours 1997, McLean was appointed a Knight Companion of the New Zealand Order of Merit, also for services to sporting journalism. He was inducted into the International Rugby Hall of Fame in 2007.

References

External links
 
 

1913 births
2004 deaths
New Zealand sportswriters
Rugby union people in New Zealand
People educated at New Plymouth Boys' High School
New Zealand Members of the Order of the British Empire
Knights Companion of the New Zealand Order of Merit
People from Whanganui
20th-century New Zealand journalists
Rugby historians and writers
Rugby players and officials awarded knighthoods
New Zealand military personnel of World War II